Beaurieux may refer to the following places in France:

 Beaurieux, Aisne, a commune in the department of Aisne
 Beaurieux, Nord, a commune in the department of Nord